Mogi Mirim Esporte Clube, more commonly referred to as Mogi Mirim, is a Brazilian football club based in Mogi Mirim, São Paulo.

Founded on 1 February 1932, the team's home ground is the Estádio Vail Chaves, which has a capacity of 19,900. 

The club's home colours are red and white and the team mascot is a toad.

History

The club was founded on February 1, 1932, and since its first year the club has been competing in tournaments organized by the Federação Paulista de Futebol (Paulista Football Federation).
The club became a professional team in the 1950s, but its results were poor at the beginning. In the 1980s, after the arrival of Wilson de Barros as club president, Mogi Mirim began to see results and eventually was promoted to the Campeonato Paulista first division. The club was relegated to the second division in 1994, but was promoted again to the first division the following year.

In 2008, Rivaldo, who is one of the most famous Brazilian footballers, became the chairman of the club.

In December 2014, shortly after the club's promotion to the Série B, Rivaldo put the club up for sale on Instagram. In the following year, the club returned to the Série C, and after that, the team suffered a string of consecutive relegations in both national and state levels, ending with a relegation to the state fourth level in 2018. The team hasn't participated in any official competitions since then.

Current squad
Correct as of 2016.

Stadium

The Romildo Vitor Gomes Ferreira stadium was previously known as Papa João Paulo II, named after Pope John Paul II, but after the ex-player Rivaldo became the club's president, he decided to change the stadium's name after his father's name.

Former coaches
 Arthur Neto
 Adílson Batista
 Ailton Silva
 Argel Fucks
 Dado Cavalcanti
 Edinho

Achievements
 Campeonato Paulista Série A2:
 Winners (2): 1985, 1995
 Campeonato Paulista do Interior:
 Winners (1): 2012
 Copa 90 Anos de Futebol:
 Winners (1): 1992
 Torneio Ricardo Teixeira:
 Winners (1): 1993

References

External links

Official Website

Inactive football clubs in Brazil
 
Mogi Mirim
Association football clubs established in 1932
1932 establishments in Brazil
Mogi Mirim